Xinpu Township (also known as Hsinpu) is an urban township in Hsinchu County, Taiwan.

History
Xinpu was formerly known as Baliguo, a commercial center during the Jiaqing Emperor rule of Qing Dynasty.

Geography
Area: 
Population: 33,002 (February 2023)

Administrative divisions
The township comprises 19 villages: Baoshi, Beiping, Hankeng, Jupu, Luming, Nanping, Neili, Qingshui, Shangliao, Sizuo, Tianxin, Wenshan, Wupu, Xialiao, Xinbei, Xinmin, Xinpu, Xinsheng and Zhaomen.

Tourist attractions
 Zhaomen Leisure Agricultural Zone
 Zhaomen Zone
 Taiwan Cycling Route No.1 Passes through Xinpu township.
 Recently rebuilt (Early 2019) Hsinchu County Xinpu Township Office and Visitor Center

Transportation

Bus station in the township is Xinpu Bus Station of Hsinchu Bus. Taiwan High Speed Rail passes through the western part of the township, but there is no planned station.

Education

Elementary
Xinzhuxianxinbuzhenguomin High School
Hsinchu County Xinpu Township National High School

Ching-Shuei Elementary School

Xinzhuxianxinbuzhenbaoshi Elementary School
Hsinchu County Xinpu County Bao-shi Elementary School

Xinzhuxianxinbuzhenxinbu Elementary School
Hsinchu County Xinpu County Xinpu Elementary School

Xinzhuxianxinbuzhenwenshan Elementary School
Hsinchu County Xinpu County Wen-shan Elementary School

Fangliao Elementary School

Jhao-Men Elementary School

Xinzhuxianxinbuzhenxinxing Elementary School
Hsinchu County Xinpu County Xin-xing Elementary School

Chao-Tung Elementary School

High schools 
Xinzhuxianzhaomenguomin High School
Hsinchu County Zhao-men High School

School Library Pei Pin, Hsin Chuw County
Hsinchu County Pei-ping Waldorf School

新竹縣照海華德福實驗教育機構
Hsinchu County Tsio-hai Waldorf Education Organization

Tianzhujiaoneisi Vocational High School
Nei-si Catholic Vocational High School

Other
新埔數位機會中心(新埔DOC)
Xinpu [Something, ?"Digital Chance"?] Center

新竹縣私立仁美幼兒園
Hsinchu County Ren-mei Private Kindergarten

Notable natives
 Fangge Dupan, poet
 Lin Ming-chang, chemist

References

External links

 Xinpu Township Office 

 Xinpu Township 
Probably will error 404 please head back to home page Taiwan, Heart of Asia and type in search bar "Xinpu Township" and search.

Townships in Hsinchu County